Angus Semey Fregon (18 July 1880 – 13 February 1956) was an Australian rules footballer who played for the St Kilda Football Club in the Victorian Football League (VFL).

Notes

External links 

1880 births
1956 deaths
People from Omeo
Australian rules footballers from Victoria (Australia)
St Kilda Football Club players